Boneh-ye Abbas may refer to:
 Boneh-ye Abbas, Bushehr
 Boneh-ye Abbas, Khuzestan

See also